The Court of Appeal of New Brunswick (frequently referred to as New Brunswick Court of Appeal or NBCA) is the appellate court in the province of New Brunswick. There are five Justices, one Chief Justice, any former judge of the Court of Appeal who is a supernumerary judge and any former Chief Justice of New Brunswick who is a judge or a supernumerary judge. The court sits in Fredericton, New Brunswick. Cases are heard by a panel of three judges.

As of 2018, the Chief Justice is the Honourable Marc Richard.

Jurisdiction 
The court hears appeals from the Court of King's Bench of New Brunswick, Provincial Court of New Brunswick, and various tribunals. Cases tried by the court can be appealed to the Supreme Court of Canada, but in practice this happens only a few times a year.

Current judges 

Supernumerary

References

External links 
New Brunswick Court of Appeal

New Brunswick
New Brunswick courts
Fredericton